Kiyeng is a surname of Kenyan origin. Notable people with the surname include:

David Kemboi Kiyeng (born 1983), Kenyan marathon runner
Hyvin Kiyeng Jepkemoi (born 1992), Kenyan steeplechase runner
Judy Kiyeng (born 1993), Kenyan middle-distance runner

Kenyan names
Surnames of African origin